This is a list of post-nominal letters used in Barbados after a person's name in order to indicate their positions, qualifications, memberships, or other status.

The said orders and decorations and their post-nominals are placed after the Barbados Jubilee Honour.

List of post-nominal letters

References 

Post
B
Post